"Head Over Heels in Love" is a song by Kevin Keegan, the former football player and manager. It was released as a single on 9 June 1979 by EMI Records. The single features another original song, "Move on Down" as the B-side, which unlike "Head Over Heels in Love", is more of a hard rock song.

Background
The single peaked at number 31 in the UK Singles Chart and climbed to number 20 in Austria, and 10 in Germany where Keegan was based at the time, and where co-writer Chris Norman's band Smokie were popular.

References

1979 singles
1979 songs
Songs written by Chris Norman